John "Slider" Shuttleworth was a British motorcycle speedway rider who rode for the Leicester Stadium team in the early years of the sport.

Shuttleworth rode in some of the earliest speedway races in Britain, including races at Audenshaw in 1928. He was part of the Stadium team in 1929, riding in the English Dirt Track League. In 1930 he only represented the team once, in a challenge match against Nottingham.

He was known for his practical jokes, one of which was to place a small balloon full of red ink inside his crash helmet, giving the appearance of blood should he fall and bang his head, which he would often do for dramatic effect if he was losing a race.

References

British speedway riders
English motorcycle racers
Leicester Stadium riders
Year of birth missing
Year of death missing